Martinton is a village in Martinton Township, Iroquois County, Illinois, United States. The population was 381 at the 2010 census.

Geography
Martinton is located in northeastern Iroquois County at  (40.915315, -87.726289). Illinois Route 1 follows the western border of the village, leading north  to St. Anne and south  to Watseka, the Iroquois County seat.

Demographics

As of the census of 2000, there were 375 people, 135 households, and 102 families residing in the village. The racial makeup of the village was 97.33% White, 1.60% African American, 0.27% Native American, 0.27% Asian, 0.27% from other races, and 0.27% from two or more races. Hispanic or Latino of any race were 0.80% of the population.

There were 135 households, out of which 40.7% had children under the age of 18 living with them, 64.4% were married couples living together, 6.7% had a female householder with no husband present, and 24.4% were non-families. 20.0% of all households were made up of individuals, and 10.4% had someone living alone who was 65 years of age or older.  The average household size was 2.78 and the average family size was 3.21.

In the village, the population was spread out, with 32.0% under the age of 18, 6.1% from 18 to 24, 32.5% from 25 to 44, 20.3% from 45 to 64, and 9.1% who were 65 years of age or older.  The median age was 32 years. For every 100 females, there were 85.6 males.  For every 100 females age 18 and over, there were 90.3 males.

The median income for a household in the village was $44,583, and the median income for a family was $51,042. Males had a median income of $29,821 versus $23,214 for females. The per capita income for the village was $16,208.  About 4.6% of families and 4.6% of the population were below the poverty line, including 4.5% of those under age 18 and 15.0% of those age 65 or over.

References

Villages in Iroquois County, Illinois
Villages in Illinois